St. Louis Stars  may refer to:
St. Louis Stars (1937), a Negro league baseball team that played in 1937 only
St. Louis–New Orleans Stars, known as the St. Louis Stars in 1939
St. Louis Stars (soccer), a soccer team of the North American Soccer League
ASC St. Louis Stars, an association football (soccer) team that plays in the Saint-Martin Senior League